The 2012–13 Idaho State Bengals men's basketball team represented Idaho State University during the 2012–13 NCAA Division I men's basketball season. The Bengals, led by first year head coach Bill Evans, played their home games at Reed Gym, with three home games at Holt Arena, and were members of the Big Sky Conference. They finished the season 6–24, 5–15 in Big Sky play to finish in a tie for tenth place. They failed to qualify for the Big Sky tournament.

Roster

Schedule

|-
!colspan=9| Exhibition

|-
!colspan=9| Regular season

References

Idaho State Bengals men's basketball seasons
Idaho State
IIdaho
IIdaho